Matti Kannas (25 September 1928 – 21 October 2000) was a Finnish footballer. He played in nine matches for the Finland national football team from 1955 to 1959.

References

1928 births
2000 deaths
Finnish footballers
Finland international footballers
Place of birth missing
Association footballers not categorized by position